"Little Girl" is a popular song recorded by the California group the Syndicate of Sound, and written by Don Baskin and Bob Gonzalez of the band. It reached the US national pop charts in June 1966, peaking at #5 on Cash Box and #8 on Billboard.

Background
After winning a Bay Area "Battle of the Bands" contest in 1965, the Syndicate of Sound recorded a single "Prepare For Love", which was ultimately unsuccessful. Don Baskin and Bob Gonzales then wrote "Little Girl", which was recorded for Hush Records and released in early 1966. After becoming a regional hit around the San Jose, California area, Bell Records picked it up for national distribution, the label then offered them an album contract. Prior to going into the studio, Larry Ray was replaced on lead guitar by Jim Sawyers. The album was recorded in three weeks, after which the band embarked on a nationwide tour supporting among others, Paul Revere & the Raiders, the Young Rascals, and The Yardbirds.

Chart history

Other recordings
The Residents as part of their Third Reich 'n Roll album of 1976. 
British group The Banned had a UK hit with it in 1977, reaching #36 in December.
The Dead Boys on their first album Young, Loud and Snotty, released in 1977.
Australian group Divinyls released their own version of the song titled "Hey Little Boy" in 1988. It went to #23 on the Australian charts.
R.E.M. played the song in their very early shows.

Personnel

 Don Baskin – vocals, guitar
 Bob Gonzalez – bass guitar
 John Sharkey – keyboards
 Larry Ray – lead guitar
 John Duckworth – drums

See also 
 List of 1960s one-hit wonders in the United States

References

External links 
 Syndicate of Sound website

1966 songs
1966 singles
Bell Records singles
Jangle pop songs